Lake Falconer Ayson (7 June 1855 – 17 June 1927) was a New Zealand farm labourer, rabbit inspector, acclimatisation officer and fisheries inspector. He was born in Warepa, near Balclutha in South Otago, New Zealand, on 7 June 1855.

References

1855 births
1927 deaths
People from Otago
New Zealand farmers
People from the Catlins